Keep the Change is a 1992 American made-for-television Western drama film directed by Andy Tennant. It stars William Petersen, Jack Palance, Lolita Davidovich, Rachel Ticotin and Buck Henry. It won a Spur Award from the Western Writers of America in 1992.

Plot
Joe Starling, a failing artist, who deserted his family's ranch to live in California with his girlfriend Astrid. However, he leaves Astrid behind & returns to his home in Montana in search of life's meaning, & resolve a mid-life identity crisis by raising cattle. But once he arrives back, he discovers his old rival, Overstreet, a tough, rugged rancher who hasn't changed, will stop at nothing to get Joe's family's land into his hands. Both men are pitted against each other in a struggle for land. Along the way, Joe encounters ghost from the past, including Overstreet's daughter & his old high school sweetheart Ellen. He discovers she has a daughter, who he didn't know he's the father, & she married his old high school rival Billy Kelton, which becomes complicated. He soon realize that he too has a dark secret, that he's able to come to terms of what he's dealt with in the past.

Cast
 William Petersen as Joe Starling
 Rachel Ticotin as Astrid
 Lolita Davidovich as Ellen Kelton
 Buck Henry as Smitty
 Jeff Kober as Billy Kelton
 Fred Dalton Thompson as Otis
 Lois Smith as Lureen
 Jack Palance as Overstreet
 Frank Collison as Darryl Burke

Production
Ron Carr, a freelance location manager for Ted Turner's cable television station TNT said that much of the film would be shot in Montana.

With a budget at $3 million, principal photography began on September 9, 1991. Filming the cattle scenes took place at Turner's Flying D. Ranch near Gallatin Gateway, Montana. All the ranch scenes were filmed at Paradise Valley, Montana. The town scenes were filmed in Livingston, Montana. The beginning of the film was shot in Los Angeles, California  Production lasted for 22 days, & was completed on October 1, 1991.

Release
Keep The Change aired on TNT on June 9, 1992.

References

External links

1992 television films
1992 films
1992 drama films
Films directed by Andy Tennant
TNT Network original films
American drama television films
1990s American films